Alexander Vladimirovich Men (22 January 1935 – 9 September 1990) was a Soviet Russian Orthodox priest, dissident, theologian, biblical scholar and writer on theology, Christian history and other religions.

Men wrote dozens of books (including his magnum opus, History of Religion: In Search of the Way, the Truth and the Life, the seventh volume of which, Son of Man, served as the introduction to Christianity for thousands of citizens in the Soviet Union); baptized hundreds if not thousands; founded an Orthodox open university; opened one of the first Sunday schools in Russia as well as a charity group at the Russian Children's Hospital. His influence is still widely felt and his legacy continues to grow among Christians both in Russia and abroad. He was murdered early on a Sunday morning, on 9 September 1990, by an ax-wielding assailant outside his home in Semkhoz, Russia.

Early life and career 
Men was born in Moscow to a Jewish family on 22 January 1935. He was baptized at six months along with his mother in the banned Catacomb Church, a branch of the Russian Orthodox Church that refused to cooperate with the Soviet authorities.

When Men was 6 years old, the NKVD arrested his father, Volf Gersh-Leybovich (Vladimir Grigoryevich) Men (born 1902). Volf spent more than a year under guard and then was assigned to labor in the Ural Mountains. His son Alexander studied at the Moscow Fur-and-Down Institute in 1955 and transferred to Irkutsk Agriculture Institute from which was expelled in 1958 due to his religious beliefs. In the same year one month after his expulsion, he was ordained a deacon. In, 1960 he became a priest upon graduating from the Leningrad Theological Seminary. In 1965, he completed studies at Moscow Theological Academy.

Priesthood 
Alexander Men became a leader with considerable influence and a good reputation among Christians both locally and abroad, among Roman Catholics and Protestants, as well as Orthodox. He served in a series of parishes near Moscow. A unique combination of broad erudition, openness to secular culture, science, to other confessions, to non-Christian religions, and deep Christian roots from the Catacomb Church propelled him into the ranks of leading Christian preachers.

Starting in the early 1970s, Men became a popular figure in Russia's religious community, especially among the intelligentsia. Men was harassed by the KGB for his active missionary and evangelistic efforts. In the late 1980s, he utilised the mass media to spread the message of Christ (he was offered to host a nationally televised program on religion); his days and nights were full of teaching and lecturing at packed lecture halls. Men was one of the founders of the Russian Bible Society in 1990; that same year he founded the Open Orthodox University and "The World of the Bible" journal. His strenuous efforts in educating the Russian populace in the basics and dynamics of the Orthodox faith has garnered him the label by the Soviet newspaper Sotsialisticheskaya Industriya as a modern-day apostle to the Soviet intelligentsia. However, some representatives of the Orthodox circles have voiced their opinion that several of Fr. Alexander's views were not sufficiently “orthodox” and even advised against using his books as an introduction to Orthodoxy.

Murder 
On Sunday morning, 9 September 1990, he was murdered while walking along the wooded path from his home in the Russian village of Semkhoz (near Moscow) to the local train platform. He was on his way to catch the train to Novaya Derevnya to celebrate the Divine Liturgy. Men had served at the parish in Novaya Derevnya for 20 years. His assailant's or assailants' use of an axe indicated a possible revenge motive. The murder occurred around the time of the dissolution of the Soviet Union, and despite orders from within the Soviet (and later the Russian) government that the case be further investigated, the murder remains unsolved. His funeral was held on the day in the Orthodox calendar which commemorates the beheading of John the Baptist.

Legacy
Since his death, Men's works and ideas have been seen as controversial among the conservative faction of the Russian Orthodox Church, citing his strong tendencies towards ecumenism which his books advocate. Nonetheless, Men has a considerable number of supporters, some of whom argue for his canonization. His lectures are regularly broadcast over Russian radio. His books are published freely in Russia nowadays. During his lifetime, they had to be printed abroad; mainly in Brussels, Belgium by the publishing house Foyer Chrétien Oriental and circulated in secret. Several key Russian Orthodox parishes encourage following his example as one who faithfully followed Christ. Two Russian Orthodox churches have been built on the site of his assassination and a growing number of believers in both Russia and abroad consider him a martyr.

In conjunction with the 25th year Commemoration of Memory, the Moscow Patriarchate Izdatel'stvo publishing house has begun a project to publish Fr. Men's "Collected Works" in a series of 15 volumes.

Men's son, Mikhail Men, is a Russian political figure who from 2005 to 2013 served as the Governor of Ivanovo Oblast and now as Minister of Construction Industry, Housing and Utilities Sector in Dmitry Medvedev's Cabinet. He is also a musician known outside Russia for the Michael Men Project.

Works
Alexander Men's greatest work is his History of Religion, published in seven volumes under the title In Search of the Way, the Truth, and the Life (volumes 1–6, Brussels, 1970–1983; 2nd edition Moscow, 1991–1992) in which the author examines the history of non-Christian religions as a way for Christians in the struggle of Magiism and Monotheism. Also including as the seventh volume his most famous work, Son of Man (Brussels, 1969; 2nd edition Moscow, 1991). Because of the persecution in the Soviet Union at the time, the Brussels editions were published under a pseudonym.
Father Alexander Men was one of the first pioneers of Christian “samizdat” (self-publishing) of the 1960s.

An English translation of Son of Man by Mormon author Samuel Brown was completed in 1998, but is now out of print, as are several other works in English translation. In 2014, a new project was commenced by Revd Alastair Macnaughton (1954–2017), an Anglican priest and Russian scholar, to translate the entire History of Religion, into the English language for the first time. Volume 1 was published in 2018. An abridged version of the entire Fr. Alexander Men's magnum opus History of Religion in Two Volumes was also translated into English in 2021 (which additionally includes the history of Christianity of the first millennium). Recent works of Alexander Men in English translation include:

"An Inner Step Toward God: Writings and teachings on Prayer", (2014) ;
"Russian Religious Philosophy: 1989–1990 Lectures" (2015)  (in 25th Year Memory Commemoration).
"The Wellsprings of Religion. The History of Religion: In Search of the Way, the Truth, and the Life Vol 1", Trans. Alastair Macnaughton.  (2018) 
"History of Religion in Two Volumes" (2021). Volume 1 surveys humanity's spiritual search from ancient times to the coming of Christ, and Volume 2 is an overview of the history of the Church in the first millennium.

Many other works by Alexander Men have been published in Russian, most notably:

Heaven on Earth (1969), published abroad under pseudonym, later reissued in Russia;
"Where Did This All Come From?" (1972), published abroad under pseudonym, later reissued in Russia;
"How to Read the Bible?" (1981), published abroad under pseudonym, later reissued in Russia;
"World Spiritual Culture" (1995);
"The History of Religions" (Volumes 1–2, 1997);
"The First Apostles" (1998);
"Isagogics: Old and New Testaments" (2000);
"Bibliological Dictionary" (Volumes 1–3, 2002).
“Mystery, Word, Image” (Brussels, 1980, 2nd edition. M.1991), published abroad under pseudonym.

See also
Georgy Chistyakov
List of unsolved murders

References

External links

 Slidefilm by Sergei Bessmertny - English version
 Alexander Men' Foundation, Moscow, in Russian
 Fr Alexander Men' Open Orthodox University, Moscow (English version)
 Saint Pachomius Library Links on Alexander Men
 In pictures » Fr. Alexander Men: Russian Orthodox priest of fearless faith BBC - Religion & Ethics photo gallery with captions
 Content on this page has been translated from the corresponding article in OrthoWiki.   *https://web.archive.org/web/20180719174253/https://radubrava.ru/event/alexander-men-static-exhibition/

1935 births
1990 deaths
20th-century Eastern Orthodox clergy
20th-century Eastern Orthodox martyrs
20th-century Eastern Orthodox priests
20th-century Eastern Orthodox theologians
Converts to Eastern Orthodoxy from Judaism
Eastern Orthodox biblical scholars
Eastern Orthodox theologians
People murdered in the Soviet Union
Deaths by blade weapons
Axe murder
Russian biblical scholars
Russian Eastern Orthodox priests
Russian Jews
Russian murder victims
Russian theologians
Soviet dissidents
Unsolved murders in the Soviet Union
20th-century Russian Jews